Wikramanayake is a surname. Notable people with the surname include:

Arittha R Wikramanayake, Sri Lankan lawyer
Elanga Wikramanayake, Sri Lankan lawyer
Eric Wikramanayake, Sri Lankan conservationist
Gihan Wikramanayake (1960-2018), Sri Lankan academic
Jayathma Wickramanayake (born 1990), Sri Lankan activist and UN Special Envoy on Youth
V. S. de S. Wikramanayake (1876-1952), Sri Lankan politician

Sinhalese surnames